Statistics of the Scottish Football League in season 1951–52.

Scottish League Division A

Scottish League Division B

See also
1951–52 in Scottish football

 
Scottish Football League seasons